Bendigo TAFE is a regional provider of vocational education, training and assessment services, located in northern and central Victoria, Australia. The institute has been in operation in various guises since 1854. The institute was known as the Loddon Campaspe Institute of TAFE from 1987 to 1990, Bendigo Regional Institute of TAFE (BRIT) from 1990 to 2009, before becoming Bendigo TAFE in 2009.

Bendigo TAFE services a significant geographical area of approximately 25,000 square kilometres in central and northern Victoria, with a local population of 220,000.

In May 2014, Bendigo TAFE announced that it would merge with the Melbourne-based Kangan Institute to form Bendigo Kangan Institute, however both institutes retain their existing branding.

Bendigo TAFE has five campuses, three in Bendigo, one in Echuca and another in Castlemaine.

Areas of study 
 Aged care
 Allied health
 Design
 Automotive
 Business and HR services
 Carpentry and joinery
 Children's services studies
 Community services
 Conservation and land management
 Design and drafting
 Disability services
 Educational pathways
 Electrical / electronics
 Engineering
 English language
 Food hygiene and food processing
 General education for adults
 Hairdressing
 Beauty
 Hospitality
 Information and communications technology
 Management
 Mechanical
 Metal fabrication
 Nursing
 Painting and decorating
 Plumbing
 Primary industries
 Animal studies
 International education
 Laboratory studies
 Horticulture and agriculture
 Professional writing and editing
 VCAL

References

External links
Official website

Education in Bendigo
1987 establishments in Australia
Bendigo